Tupper Creek is a stream in the U.S. state of West Virginia.

Tupper Creek has the name of a pioneer trapper.

See also
List of rivers of West Virginia

References

Rivers of Kanawha County, West Virginia
Rivers of West Virginia